The 2019 West Lindsey District Council election took place on 2 May 2019 to elect members of West Lindsey District Council in England. This was on the same day as other local elections. The Conservatives maintained overall control of the council, albeit with a reduced majority.

Results

Council composition
Following the last election in 2015, the composition of the council was:

After the election, the composition of the council was:

Lab - Independent 
I - Independent 
LI - Lincolnshire Independents

Ward Results
Incumbent councillors are denoted by an asterisk (*).

Bardney

A total of 7 ballots were rejected.

Caistor and Yarborough

A total of 56 ballots were rejected.

Cherry Willingham

A total of 26 ballots were rejected.

Dunholme and Welton

A total of 15 ballots were rejected.

Gainsborough East

Devine was previously elected as a Labour councillor. A total of 19 ballots were rejected.

Gainsborough North

A total of 19 ballots were rejected.

Gainsborough South West

A total of 8 ballots were rejected.

Hemswell

A total of 22 ballots were rejected.

Kelsey Wold

A total of 23 ballots were rejected.

Lea

A total of 13 ballots were rejected.

Market Rasen

 
A total of 46 ballots were rejected.

Nettleham

A total of 32 ballots were rejected.

Saxilby

A total of 24 ballots were rejected.

Scampton

Scotter and Blyton

A total of 83 ballots were rejected.

Stow

Sudbrooke

Torksey

A total of 38 ballots were rejected.

Waddingham and Spital 

A total of 19 ballots were rejected.

Wold View

By-elections

Torksey

Nettleham

References

2019 English local elections
May 2019 events in the United Kingdom
2019
2010s in Lincolnshire